The Pharmaceutical Journal is a professional journal covering various aspects of pharmacy, including pharmacology and pharmaceutics. It is published by, and is the official journal of, Britain's professional organisation for pharmacists, the Royal Pharmaceutical Society (formerly the Royal Pharmaceutical Society of Great Britain).

The PJ is considered to be "among the oldest professional journals in the world". It first appeared in July 1841 as a monthly journal called Transactions of the Pharmaceutical Meetings, produced by Jacob Bell, who was one of the founders of the (Royal) Pharmaceutical Society. 

The title of the journal changed to Pharmaceutical Journal and Transactions in 1842 and "within a year it had all the features of an orthodox professional journal: leading articles, meeting reports, critical commentaries, letters, and book reviews. In 1859, Bell bequeathed the journal to the Pharmaceutical Society on his deathbed. 

The monthly publication became a weekly journal in 1870, and the title The Pharmaceutical Journal was adopted in 1895.  More recently, the PJ was an early adopter of online publication. In 2015 its printed version reverted to monthly publication while the online journal continued with daily updates. In 2021, the journal ceased publishing its print edition and became online only.

References

External links 
 

1841 establishments in the United Kingdom
Academic journals published by learned and professional societies
English-language journals
Pharmacology journals
Pharmacy in the United Kingdom
Publications established in 1841
Weekly journals